Gornja Močila may refer to:

 Gornja Močila, Bosnia and Herzegovina, a village near Brod
 Gornja Močila, Croatia, a village near Rakovica